Flow Lover is the third and last album by Panamian singer-songwriter Eddy Lover. Contains 10 songs recorded and released between 2011 and 2015. It was released on April 25, 2015.

Track listing

References

2015 albums
Eddy Lover albums